Morus insignis is an evergreen tree native to Central and South America, from Guatemala to Argentina.

References 

insignis
Trees of Peru
Trees of Guatemala
Trees of Costa Rica
Trees of Ecuador
Trees of Colombia
Trees of Argentina
Trees of Bolivia
Trees of Panama
Trees of Venezuela